Keegan Palmer  (born 13 March 2003) is an Australian goofy-footed professional skateboarder specialising in park skating. He turned professional at the age of 14. Palmer has been sponsored by Nike SB, Primitive, Oakley, Independent, Bones Wheels, Bronson Speed Co., Mob, and Boost Mobile. Palmer has been ranked ranked #7 in the World Skate male park rankings.

In 2021, Palmer qualified for the 2020 Tokyo Summer Olympic Games in the park skateboarding competition.

Early life  
Palmer was born in San Diego, California, to an American father, Chris, and a South African mother, Cindy, on 12 March 2003. He moved with his family from San Diego to Australia's Gold Coast as a one-year-old. Palmer began skating at two years of age when he joined his father at the local Elanora skate park and competed in the Australian Open skating competition at eight years old. He attended King's Christian College while based on the Gold Coast and was also interested in surfing from an early age but focused mainly on skating throughout his upbringing. Palmer returned to San Diego at 14 years of age in pursuit of a professional skateboarding career.

Career 
In 2017, Palmer won the Dew Tour Am Bowl Final at age 14. Palmer made his debut in the Dew Tour in 2018, coming 7th in the finals. A year later, Palmer came 3rd in the 2019 Dew Tour finals, finishing behind Pedro Barros and Cory Juneau. In the same year, Palmer came 4th in the Park Skateboarding World Championships in São Paulo, Brazil. In 2020, Palmer won the Skate Australia National Park Championships. In 2021, Palmer qualified for the 2020 Tokyo Summer Olympic Games. On 5 August 2021, Palmer won the gold medal in the men's park skateboarding event at the Tokyo 2020 Summer Olympic Games.

Although locking in a gold medal 7.9 points ahead of his nearest rival, Palmer decided to do a victory lap. In the process, he improved his original score of 94.04 (from his first run) to 95.83 (on his third and final run), finishing 9.69 points ahead of his nearest opponent, Brazilian Pedro Barros.

In the 2022 Australia Day Honours Palmer was awarded the Medal of the Order of Australia.

References

External links 
 http://www.worldskate.org/skateboarding/results.html

Living people
2003 births
Australian skateboarders
Recipients of the Medal of the Order of Australia
American emigrants to Australia
Medalists at the 2020 Summer Olympics
Olympic gold medalists for Australia
Olympic medalists in skateboarding
Olympic skateboarders of Australia
Skateboarders at the 2020 Summer Olympics
Sportspeople from San Diego
Sportspeople from the Gold Coast, Queensland
World Skateboarding Championship medalists